Watertown is a town in Litchfield County, Connecticut, United States. The population was 22,105 at the 2020 census. The ZIP codes for Watertown are 06795 (for most of the town) and 06779 (for the Oakville section). It is a suburb of Waterbury. The urban center of the town is the Watertown census-designated place, with a population of 3,938 at the 2020 census.

Founding
Colonization of the area today called Watertown began around 1657. In that time, the colony was called "Mattatock", though it had several variations in spelling through the years. The land where Watertown is now located, having originally belonged to Mattatock, officially changed its name to Watterbury (now Waterbury) by record on March 20, 1695, by consensus of a council. The original Colony of Mattatuck, which became Watterbury, then Waterbury in name, comprised a much greater land area than Waterbury does today. Thomas Judd and other families were among the first investors to buy the land as a group. The Town of Watertown was officially incorporated in 1780.

Geography
Watertown is in southeastern Litchfield County and is bordered to the southeast by the city of Waterbury in New Haven County. Other bordering towns are Middlebury to the south, Woodbury and Bethlehem to the west, Morris to the northwest, and Thomaston to the east. It is in the Eastern Standard time zone.

Oakville, which is often mistaken for a separate town, is in the southeast part of Watertown. Although Oakville has its own post office and ZIP code, it does not have a charter or town government of its own. Oakville receives all of its town services (police, fire, water and so on) from Watertown.

Demographics

As of the census of 2000, there were 21,661 people, 8,046 households, and 5,994 families residing in the town. The racial makeup of the town was 96.46% White, 0.75% African American, 0.12% Native American, 1.27% Asian, 0.05% Pacific Islander, 0.48% from other races, and 0.87% from two or more races. Hispanic or Latino of any race were 1.87% of the population.

There were 8,046 households, out of which 34.7% had children under the age of 18 living with them, 61.7% were married couples living together, 9.4% had a female householder with no husband present, and 25.5% were non-families. 21.7% of all households were made up of individuals, and 9.4% had someone living alone who was 65 years of age or older.  The average household size was 2.67 and the average family size was 3.13.

In the town, the population was spread out, with 24.8% under the age of 18, 6.3% from 18 to 24, 29.9% from 25 to 44, 24.9% from 45 to 64, and 14.1% who were 65 years of age or older.  The median age was 39 years. For every 100 females, there were 92.0 males.  For every 100 females age 18 and over, there were 90.6 males.

The median income for a household in the town was $59,420, and the median income for a family was $68,761. Males had a median income of $47,097 versus $31,822 for females. The per capita income for the town was $26,044.  About 1.1% of families and 2.2% of the population were below the poverty line, including 0.8% of those under age 18 and 3.7% of those age 65 or over.

Transportation
The Route 8 expressway runs through the eastern edge of town, with two exits inside the town. Route 8 leads north  to Torrington and south through Waterbury  to Bridgeport. The main routes through the center of Watertown are U.S. Route 6 running east–west and Connecticut Route 63 running north–south. Route 6 leads northeast  to Hartford, the state capital, and southwest  to Danbury, while Route 63 leads north  to Litchfield and south the same distance to Naugatuck. Other important highways include Route 73 (a more direct route leading through Oakville to Waterbury) and Route 262, which runs north from Oakville through the eastern part of Watertown.

Public transportation is provided by buses of Northeast Transportation Company.

Local media
 Waterbury Republican-American, a Waterbury-based independent daily newspaper
 Town Times, Prime Publishers Inc., a local newspaper serving Watertown, Oakville, Bunker Hill in Waterbury, Thomaston and Northfield. Voices, its sister paper, covers Southbury, Middlebury, Oxford, Seymour, Naugatuck, Woodbury, Bethelhem, New Preston, Washington, Washington Depot, Roxbury, Bridgewater, Monroe, Sandy Hook and Newtown.
 Macaroni Kid, an online magazine for families in Watertown

Notable places

 The Taft School, a private boarding school
 Watertown Historical Society

Notable people

William Finneran, Mayor of Watertown (1986 to present)
 Rico Brogna, MLB first baseman who played for the Detroit Tigers, New York Mets, Philadelphia Phillies, Boston Red Sox, and Atlanta Braves from 1992 to 2001
 Joe Cipriano, television announcer CBS, Fox, radio personality WWCO, WRQX, and KIIS FM
 Erastus L. De Forest (1834–1888), mathematician
 Edward Fitzsimmons Dunne (1853–1937), 31st mayor of Chicago (1905–1907); governor of Illinois (1913–1917); born in Watertown
 Benjamin B. Hotchkiss (1826–1885), for whom the Hotchkiss School was named by his widow, was one of the leading American ordnance engineers of his day; born in Watertown but in early childhood moved to Sharon
 Leatherman (1839–1889), drifter within the Connecticut and Hudson River Valley areas, known for his leather clothing
 Meredith Mallory, former US congressman
 Chris McKenna, actor featured in State of Affairs, The Young and the Restless, and One Life to Live
 Terry Michaels, born in Waterbury and a long time Watertown resident; Radio Personality WWCO Waterbury, WNVR 14-NVR Waterbury/Naugatuck, KEIN Great Falls, MT, WTIC-FM Hartford, WDRC-FM Hartford, WWYZ Country 92.5 Hartford, (Clear Channel Communications) WICC Bridgeport, (Cumulus Broadcasting Corp) Kicks 105.5 /Danbury/Westchester County, New York
 Thomas Tessier, writer of horror novels and short stories
 John Trumbull (1750–1831), political satirist and poet; born in Watertown
 David Kenyon Webster (1922–1961), soldier, journalist and author
 Allen B. Wilson and Nathaniel Wheeler, founders of Wheeler & Wilson Manufacturing Company in Watertown, one of the first manufacturers of sewing machines

References

External links

 Town of Watertown official website

 
Towns in Litchfield County, Connecticut
Towns in the New York metropolitan area
Towns in Connecticut